Dotsoul was a massively multiplayer online role-playing game based on the Active Worlds application which ran from 2005 to 2009 and was created by Joseph Bergeron and Laura Herrmann.  A graphic and relationship intensive cyberpark, designed to facilitate the release of people's subconscious, the stated goal of the park is to create a dreamscape or playground of the mind where people creatively interact, role-play and build virtual works which bear the stamp of their personal identities.

Philosophy 
According to its creators, Dotsoul is meant to trigger the ability in participants to make something out of their own images. It gives people the option to live outside the corporate structure and creates room for independent self-discovery.  The society is, as stated on the official website "the parallel universe inside your head."

Built as a massively multiplayer online role-playing game and graphically similar to games like World of Warcraft, Half-Life, and The Sims Dotsoul creators advocate a "code":

 Respect everyone
 This is a PG rated world because like the "real world" it involves children (and a huge range of cultural experiences). Stay mindful
 No VR universe or world bashing here. Support everyone, including the competition

Residents create media, including three-dimensional graphics.

This attempt at creating a socially conscious “parallel universe” bears some relation to games such as A Force More Powerful and the project at PARC. However, unlike these games, Dotsoul is predicated on an open-architecture which is dependent on its user base for its content.

The Cyberpark

Avatars 
Dotsoul's avatars range from scuba divers, tourists, hikers to Hobbits, Superman, aliens, Clint Eastwood, Ferengi to birds, grasshoppers, apes, to historical figures, such as Navajo, Caesar, Venus, Osiris, Hotep, knights, princesses, and to science fictional, contemporary, and customized citizens.

Media and celebrity coverage 
 Haleakala Times
 Las Vegas Weekly
 Florida Times Union

Content 
 Events, such as art gallery openings, internet connections with pod casters and Myspace members, and live shows
 In May 2006, a post appeared on the official website celebrating the sale of work by Kasmira and Jason Weinberg, two Maine based artists with a large gallery inside Dotsoul.
 Internet café exposure
 DJ music
 Community service and outreach with nonprofit organizations, such as Bridges across Borders.org
 Animated video productions, games, seminars, and promotion for independent artists and entrepreneurs

Creating content 
Built on the Active Worlds platform, creating things in Dotsoul involves clicking and pasting object tags which are accessible on the objects themselves scattered throughout the park. The act of making three-dimensional spaces would appear similar to the Myspace editing programs that have become so popular in recent months with the rise of that internet behemoth.  While the Myspace editor interface allows users the ability to program in HTML without in-depth knowledge of HTML, by cutting and pasting code, in Dotsoul users cut and paste .rwx or renderware code in order to generate three-dimensional trees, rocket ships, flowers and moving objects.

See also
Active Worlds
Simulated reality

References 

(14) Bray, David, and Benn Konsynski. "Virtual worlds, virtual economies, virtual institutions." Virtual Worlds and New Realities Conference at Emory University. 2008.

(23) Bray, David A., and Benn R. Konsynski. "Virtual worlds: multi-disciplinary research opportunities." ACM SIGMIS Database 38.4 (2007): 17-25.

(12) Bray, David. "Survey: Virtual Worlds and Augmented Realty, 1991-Present."Available at SSRN 962728 (2006).

(25) Peters, Tom. "Appendix: Resources: Spanning the Globes: InterWorld Organizations." Library Technology Reports 44.7 (2008): 23-32.

(742) Bartholomew, Mark. "Advertising in the Garden of Eden." Buffalo Law Review 55 (2007): 737-775.

(14) Beatriz Cantalejo "Virtual World: an e-Business Goldmine? Exploring Real e-Business Opportunities in Virtual Worlds A Case Study: Second Life" National College of Ireland: Dublin. 2007

(69) MacLennan, Alan. "Design of virtual worlds for accessing information: discovery of user preferences."  Robert Gordon University: University of Edinburgh: 2007

(36) Redecker, Christine. "Review of learning 2.0 practices." European Commission, available at: https://web.archive.org/web/20080429043502/http://www.is/. jrc. ec. europa. eu/pages/documents/Learning2-0Review. pdf (accessed 2 April 2009) (2008).

(10) Guetteville, Jean Béhue. "The vision as the architecture of innovation?" Presented at the DRUID Summer Conference on APPROPRIABILITY, PROXIMITY, ROUTINES AND INNOVATION Centre de Recherche en Gestion de l'Ecole Polytechnique: Copenhagen, CBS, Denmark. 2007

(9) Pronovost, Sylvain, and Gerald Lai. Virtual social networking and interoperability in the Canadian Forces netcentric environment. CAE PROFESSIONAL SERVICES OTTAWA (ONTARIO), 2009.

(179) Klimczuk, Andrzej. "Games 2.0 as a Test of Socio-Cultural Perpetuum Mobile Construction." Homo Communicativus 3.5 (2008): 177.

Virtual world communities